Stan Klees (born 29 April 1932 at Toronto, Ontario) is a Canadian retired music industry businessman. He created the music recording companies Tamarac and Red Leaf Records in the 1960s.

Klees was a presenter at CHUM radio in the late 1940s then was employed by London Records. He founded Tamarac Records in 1963.

His advice to Walt Grealis led to the development of RPM Weekly in 1964. Klees formally joined RPM as a staff member in 1971 to assist with organisation and publication design. He also designed the "MAPL" logo to identify Canadian content of produced songs, also known as the Cancon movement. Klees and Grealis established RPM's annual awards for Canadian music in 1964 which led to the creation of the Juno Awards ceremonies in 1970.

In 1995, Klees was inducted into the Canadian Country Music Hall of Fame.

In 2001, Klees was awarded the Special Achievement Award at the SOCAN Awards in Toronto.

References

External links

RPM Music Weekly Tribute Site.

1932 births
Living people
Businesspeople from Toronto
20th-century Canadian businesspeople
Canadian music industry executives